Bending may refer to:

 Bending, the behavior of a structural element subjected to a lateral load
 Bending (metalworking), a sheet metalworking process used in manufacture
 Bending, the fictional ability of manipulation of the four classical elements in Avatar: The Last Airbender and its sequel, The Legend of Korra
 The flection of a tone, frequently utilized in blues and jazz music (see glissando)
 A harmonica technique used to change the pitch of a note.
 The middle name of fictional Futurama character Bender Bending Rodriguez
 Bending the rules
 String bending, a guitar technique

See also
 
 
 Bend (disambiguation)
 Flexing (disambiguation)